The Algeria national youth football team are the national under-23, under-20 and under-17 football teams of Algeria and are controlled by the Algerian Football Federation. The youth teams of Algeria participate in tournaments sanctioned by both FIFA and CAF. They also participate in world, regional, and local international tournaments.

Algeria national under-23 squad 
COACH: -

Algeria national under-20 squad 
COACH:  Mohamed Lcete

Algeria national under-17 squad 
COACH:  Rezki Remane

Youth
Youth football in Algeria